John Cannon (born July 30, 1960) is a former professional American football player who attended Holmdel High School in Holmdel, New Jersey and played defensive end for nine seasons in the National Football League (NFL) for the Tampa Bay Buccaneers.

References

1960 births
Living people
Holmdel High School alumni
People from Holmdel Township, New Jersey
People from Long Branch, New Jersey
Players of American football from New Jersey
Sportspeople from Monmouth County, New Jersey
American football defensive ends
Tampa Bay Buccaneers players
William & Mary Tribe football players
Ed Block Courage Award recipients